Diane Coyle  (born February 1961) is an economist and a former advisor to the UK Treasury. She was vice-chairman of the BBC Trust, the governing body of the British Broadcasting Corporation, and was a member of the UK Competition Commission from 2001 until 2019. Since March 2018, she has been the Bennett Professor of Public Policy at the University of Cambridge, co-directing the Bennett Institute.

Early life
Coyle was born in Bury, Lancashire, and attended Bury Grammar School for Girls, where a teacher engaged her "very sceptical and mathematical" mind with the logical way of thinking required in economics. She did her undergraduate studies at Brasenose College, Oxford, reading philosophy, politics, and economics, before gaining an MA and a PhD in Economics from Harvard University, graduating in 1985, her thesis was titled The dynamic behaviour of employment (wages, contracts, productivity, business cycle).

Career

Coyle was an economist at the UK Treasury from 1985 to 1986, and later became the European Editor of Investors Chronicle between 1993 and 2001 and economics editor of The Independent.

She has written a series of books focused on educating people about different aspects of economics. She has said that her first book, The Weightless World (1997), was a contribution to the creation of a radical centre.  Another book explores concepts of "enoughness" and sustainability.

Coyle was also a member of the UK's Competition Commission from 2001 to 2009, a member of the Royal Economic Society, previously a member of the UK Border Agency's Migration Advisory Committee from 2009 to 2014, and a fellow of the Royal Society of Arts.

Coyle was previously a presenter on BBC Radio 4 and was a member of the BBC Trust from November 2006 until April 2015. On 7 April 2011 the Queen approved Coyle's appointment as the Vice-Chairman of the BBC Trust, the governing body of the British Broadcasting Corporation. She also has been contributing regularly to Project Syndicate since 2017.

Coyle has praised the news coverage of the BBC, saying "I've always valued the BBC, not least as the best provider of news coverage in the world. Its impartiality and comprehensive coverage underpin its vital civic role." However, in 2009 she was critical of the BBC's programming, stating "Viewers are becoming increasingly cynical and disappointed by the programmes offered by the BBC and the UK's other main TV channels." "Among the negative comments there are complaints about a lack of variety, too much soap or costume drama…disappointment about old series being brought back and a degree of cynicism over 'rehashing' and ripping off old ideas".

She was a professor of economics at the University of Manchester from 2014 to 2018.

Since March 2018, she has been the Bennett Professor of Public Policy at the University of Cambridge, co-directing the Bennett Institute. Coyle was critical of the economics profession in 2021 due to its lack of diversity, and she is critical of universal basic income as an idea.

Coyle is managing director of Enlightenment Economics, an economic consultancy to large corporate clients and international organisations, specialising in new technologies and globalisation. She was employed by EDF Energy on its stakeholder advisory panel.

Following her Indigo Prize-winning essay on radically replacing GDP measurements, Coyle now leads the Six Capitals research project, funded by LetterOne, at the Bennett Institute for Public Policy at Cambridge University; the project was inaugurated in January 2019 and explores social and natural capital. At the 2018 New Year Honours, Coyle received the award of Commander of the Most Excellent Order of the British Empire (CBE) for her contributions to economics.

Personal life

She is married to the former BBC News' Technology Correspondent Rory Cellan-Jones. The couple have two sons and live in West Ealing, London.

She and Cellan-Jones adopted Sophie, a nervous rescue dog from Romania, in December 2022. They have reported on Twitter about Sophie's slow progress in settling in via the hashtag #sophiefromromania.

Honours
In the 2009 New Year Honours, Coyle was appointed Officer of the Order of the British Empire (OBE) "for services to economics".

She was recognized as one of the BBC's 100 women of 2013.

In 2016, Coyle was elected a Fellow of the Academy of Social Sciences (FAcSS).

In 2017, Coyle and Benjamin Mitra-Kahn won the inaugural Indigo Prize, along with co-winner economics professor Jonathan Haskel, for submitting the best hypothetical plans to overhaul GDP as an economic measurement as economies move more into the digital and information age.

Coyle was appointed Commander of the Order of the British Empire (CBE) in the 2018 New Year Honours for "services to Economics and the Public Understanding of Economics".

Published works
 Cogs and Monsters: What Economics Is, and What It Should Be (October 2021). Princeton University Press, 
 Markets, States, and People: Economics for Public Policy (January 2020). Princeton University Press, 
 GDP: A Brief but Affectionate History (January 2014). Princeton University Press, 
 The Economics of Enough: How to Run the Economy as If the Future matters (2011). Princeton University Press, 
 The Soulful Science: What Economists Really Do and Why It Matters (2007). Princeton University Press, 
 Sex, Drugs and Economics: An Unconventional Introduction to Economics (2002). Texere, 
 Paradoxes of Prosperity: Why the New Capitalism Benefits All (2001). Texere, 
 Governing the World Economy (2000). Polity, 
 The Weightless World (1997). MIT Press,

References

External links

 Competition Commission biography
 Biography at LSE's economics department
 Interview at 3am magazine
 Diane Coyle articles at Prospect magazine
 Diane Coyle lecture to the Friends of the Earth
 September 2006 podcast interview re mobile phones in Africa
 

1961 births
Living people
Academics of the University of Manchester
Alumni of Brasenose College, Oxford
BBC Radio 4 presenters
Chairmen of the BBC
Commanders of the Order of the British Empire
Électricité de France people
English economists
Fellows of Churchill College, Cambridge
British women economists
Harvard Graduate School of Arts and Sciences alumni
People from Bury, Greater Manchester
People educated at Bury Grammar School (Girls)
Radical centrist writers
The Independent people
Trustees of the British Broadcasting Corporation
BBC 100 Women
Fellows of the Academy of Social Sciences
British women radio presenters
Civil servants in HM Treasury